Gary Peterson is an American record producer. He is probably best known as the creator of Golden Throats. Peterson and partner Pat Sierchio produced four volumes of the series for Rhino Records, which collect bizarre examples of celebrities singing pop music classics.

Peterson began as Rhino's first dedicated editor, researching, proofing and overseeing all the information printed on their audio releases, and is credited for embellishing packages with original recording and release information (and often full discographies) in the burgeoning days of the reissue business. He worked for Rhino Entertainment and the Warner Music Group from 1984 to 2004, and eventually produced a number of reissues and compilations of artists such as Todd Rundgren, Warren Zevon, Little Feat, Fleetwood Mac, Captain Beefheart, Devo, The Spinners, Tower Of Power, Chicago, The Doobie Brothers, Michael McDonald, Carly Simon, Linda Ronstadt, Daryl Hall & John Oates, Edgar Winter, Gary Wright, Lee Michaels, Cactus, Poco, Tommy James & The Shondells, and Sammy Davis Jr. Besides Golden Throats, he co-produced other "various artists" collections, such as the Poptopia series which anthologized "power pop" music, and the Supernatural Fairy Tales: The Progressive Rock Era boxed set. Examples of his exhaustive vault research can be found in Little Feat's Grammy-nominated boxed set Hotcakes & Outtakes,  and the reissue of Waiting For Columbus, as well as the expanded reissues of Fleetwood Mac's Rumours and Tusk (which AMG noted as "one of the finest expanded reissues of a classic record yet released.").

References

External links
The Sad Sounds Of Singing Actors
Covers By Unlikely Big Stars Is An Album So Bad, It's Good
A Hit Parade: When Capt. Kirk Took On The Beatles
Album Brings Back Highly Brittle Star Trash
The Singer, Not The Song, Makes 'Golden Throats'
Voices That Shatter Class
Torched Songs 
Star Dreck 
Celebs Make World's Worst Rock Album!
Some Unlikely Crooners Have Made Recordings That Have Turned Into Very Entertaining Collectibles
Country Music Is The Prey
Ahhh, Bad Music. There's Nothing Like It
These Beatles Covers Are Forgettable Camp
Songs In The Key Of...What?
Celebs Should Have Confined Singing To Shower

Year of birth missing (living people)
Living people
American record producers